Prairie Township is one of the fourteen townships of Holmes County, Ohio, United States. As of the 2010 census the population was 3,133, up from 2,785 at the 2000 census. In 2010, 2,761 of the population lived in the unincorporated portion of the township.

Geography
Located in the northern part of the county, it borders the following townships:
Franklin Township, Wayne County - north
Salt Creek Township, Wayne County - northeast corner
Salt Creek Township - east
Hardy Township - south
Monroe Township - southwest
Ripley Township - west
Clinton Township, Wayne County - northwest corner

The village of Holmesville is located in central Prairie Township.

Name and history
Statewide, the only other Prairie Township is located in Franklin County.

Government
The township is governed by a three-member board of trustees, who are elected in November of odd-numbered years to a four-year term beginning on the following January 1. Two are elected in the year after the presidential election and one is elected in the year before it. There is also an elected township fiscal officer, who serves a four-year term beginning on April 1 of the year after the election, which is held in November of the year before the presidential election. Vacancies in the fiscal officership or on the board of trustees are filled by the remaining trustees.

References

External links
County website

Townships in Holmes County, Ohio
Townships in Ohio